Aitor Embela Gil (born 17 April 1996) is a professional footballer who plays as a goalkeeper for Tercera División RFEF club UD Somozas. Born in Spain, he represents the Equatorial Guinea national team.

Club career
Born in Figueres, Girona, Catalonia and raised in Altura and Segorbe, Province of Castellón, Valencian Community, Embela joined Villarreal CF's youth setup in 2004, aged eight, after starting it out at locals CD Altura. In the 2012 summer he joined Málaga CF, being assigned to the Juvenil squad.

On 14 July 2015 Embela signed a two-year deal with CF Reus Deportiu, in Segunda División B. He terminated his contract with Reus on 29 August of the following year, and two days later he signed a one-year deal with Real Valladolid B.

International career
On 3 January 2015 Embela was included in Esteban Becker's Equatorial Guinea 23-men list for the 2015 Africa Cup of Nations. Four days later he made his international debut, starting in a 1–1 non-FIFA friendly draw against Cape Verde.

Embela served as a backup to Felipe Ovono during the tournament, as his side finished fourth. He made his full international debut on 26 March, starting in a 0–2 friendly loss against Egypt.

Personal life
Embela's father, José Manuel, was also a footballer. A forward, he appeared mainly in Segunda División B before becoming a coach. His paternal grandfather, Gustavo Chomé Mbela Bueneque, was born in Dibolo, Wele-Nzas, making him eligible to both Equatorial Guinea and Spain.

Career statistics

International

References

External links

1996 births
Living people
People from Figueres
Sportspeople from the Province of Girona
Citizens of Equatorial Guinea through descent
Spanish sportspeople of Equatoguinean descent
Equatoguinean sportspeople of Spanish descent
Equatoguinean people of Catalan descent
Spanish footballers
Footballers from the Valencian Community
Equatoguinean footballers
Association football goalkeepers
CF Reus Deportiu players
Real Valladolid Promesas players
Tercera División players
Segunda División B players
Equatorial Guinea international footballers
2015 Africa Cup of Nations players
CE Sabadell FC B players
FC Jumilla players
UD Logroñés B players
Lorca FC players